The Moldova women's national football team represents Moldova in association football and is controlled by the Moldovan Football Federation, the governing body for football in Moldova. They have never qualified for the FIFA Women's World Cup or the UEFA Women's Championship. Eduard Blănuță has been the manager of the national team since 4 February 2019. The current captain of the national team is midfielder Ludmila Caraman. Currently ranked 86th by FIFA, the team plays their home games at the Zimbru Stadium in the city of Chișinău, the country's capital.

History
Moldova first official match, a 0–4 defeat to  
Republic of Ireland, took place on 12 September 2001.

Results and fixtures

 The following is a list of match results in the last 12 months, as well as any future matches that have been scheduled.

Legend

2022

2023

Competitive record

FIFA Women's World Cup

UEFA Women's Euro

Players

Current squad
 The following players were called up for the match against Italy and Switzerland on 17 and 21 September 2021.
 Caps and goals as of 21 September 2021.

Recent call-ups
 The following players were also named to a squad in the last 12 months.

All-time record
Only competitive matches are included and correct as of 6 September 2022.

See also

Moldova women's national under-19 football team
Moldova women's national under-17 football team

References

External links
Football Association of Moldova 
FIFA Team Profile

 
European women's national association football teams